The Ústí nad Labem derailment occurred on 28 June 2010 when a CityElefant train derailed at Ústí nad Labem, Czech Republic. The driver was killed and eleven passengers were injured.

Train
The train involved was a ČD Class 471 CityElefant double deck electric multiple unit that had been manufactured in 2001.

Accident
At 16:47 CEST, the train was derailed on approach to its final scheduled stop, Ústí nad Labem hlavní nádraží, in the southern suburb of Vaňov. It was almost at the end of its journey from Prague when the accident happened. The leading carriage smashed into a concrete wall after being derailed. The driver was killed and eleven passengers were injured, including two with serious injuries. The train's cab car was irreparably destroyed, while the other two cars survived with only minor structural defects. The line, which forms part of an international railway corridor linking Prague and Berlin, was closed following the accident, although one track was later reopened to traffic but requiring the use of diesel locomotives as the overhead wiring had been damaged.

Cause
The most probable cause of the disaster is thus either a fault of the brakes or the driver's inattention.

References

2010 in the Czech Republic
Railway accidents in 2010
Derailments in the Czech Republic
Ústí nad Labem District
Accidents and incidents involving České dráhy
2010 disasters in the Czech Republic